New York's 69th State Assembly district is one of the 150 districts in the New York State Assembly. It has been represented by Democrat Daniel J. O'Donnell since 2003.

Geography
District 69 is located in Manhattan, comprising Manhattan Valley, Morningside Heights, and portions of the Upper West Side and West Harlem.

Recent election results

202

2020

2018

2016

2014

2012

2010

References

69